Woraphol Thongkhamchu (born 1 January 1968) is a Thai former professional tennis player active on the international tour in the 1980s and 1990s. He is now a police Lieutenant Colonel.

Thongkhamchu represented the Thailand Davis Cup team every year from 1986 to 1997, featuring in a total of 27 ties for his country. He registered 36 wins overall, of which 31 came in singles rubbers, with his best win coming against New Zealand's Kelly Evernden in 1987. 

Outside of the Davis Cup, Thongkhamchu also represented Thailand regionally at the Asian Games and Southeast Asian Games. He was the Southeast Asian Games men's singles champion in 1989 and 1995.

References

External links
 
 
 

1968 births
Living people
Woraphol Thongkhamchu
Medalists at the 1986 Asian Games
Tennis players at the 1986 Asian Games
Woraphol Thongkhamchu
Asian Games medalists in tennis
Southeast Asian Games medalists in tennis
Woraphol Thongkhamchu
Woraphol Thongkhamchu
Woraphol Thongkhamchu
Competitors at the 1985 Southeast Asian Games
Competitors at the 1987 Southeast Asian Games
Competitors at the 1989 Southeast Asian Games
Competitors at the 1991 Southeast Asian Games
Competitors at the 1993 Southeast Asian Games
Competitors at the 1995 Southeast Asian Games
Competitors at the 1997 Southeast Asian Games
Tennis players at the 1994 Asian Games
Woraphol Thongkhamchu